Nikos Gatsos (8 December 1911 – 12 May 1992) was a Greek poet, translator and lyricist.

Biography
Nikos Gatsos was born in 1911 in Asea in Arcadia, a district of the Peloponnese, where he finished primary school (dimotiko). He attended high school (gymnasio) in Tripoli, where he became acquainted with literature and foreign languages. Afterwards, he moved to Athens, where he studied literature, philosophy, and history at the University of Athens for two years only.   His knowledge of English and French was quite good and he was already familiar with Kostis Palamas, Dionysios Solomos, Greek folk songs, and recent trends in European poetry. In Athens, he came in contact with the literary circles of the day becoming one of the lifelong friends of fellow poet Odysseus Elytis  and published his poems, small in extent and in a classic style, in the magazines Nea Estia (1931–32) and Rythmos (1933). During that period he also published criticism in Makedonikes Imeres (Μακεδονικές Ημέρες), Rythmos (Ρυθμός), and Nea Grammata (Νέα Γράμματα) (for Kostis Bastias, Myrtiotissa, and Thrasos Kastanakis, respectively).

In 1935 he lived in France, in Paris and the South of France.

In 1936 he met Odysseus Elytis, his "brother" in poetry.

In 1943, Aetos published his long poem Amorgos, a major contribution to contemporary Greek poetry  notable especially for its combination of surrealism with traditional Greek folk poetry motifs. He subsequently published three more poems: "Elegeio" (1946) in Filologika Chronika, "The Knight and Death" (Ο ιππότης κι ο θάνατος) (1947), and "Song of Old Times" (Τραγούδι του παλιού καιρού) (1963), dedicated to Yorgos Seferis, in Tachydromos magazine.
   
After World War II, he worked with the Greek-British Review as a translator and with Ellinikí Radiofonía as a radio director. During that period he also began writing lyrics for the music of Manos Hadjidakis, opening a brilliant career in modern Greek songwriting. In due course he also collaborated with Mikis Theodorakis and other notable composers.

His work as a whole combines universal poetic themes such as the problems of evil, injustice, sacrifice, and the pains of love, with more specifically Greek concerns such as the sorrows of exile.

His capability to handle language with accuracy led the "Art Theatre", the "National Theatre" and the "Popular Theatre" of Greece to entrust him with translations of various plays -translations that became "legendary"- first and foremost being "Blood Wedding" by Federico Garcia Lorca.

He had a special relationship with Manos Hadjidakis and Nana Mouskouri. His British friends were Philip Sherrard, Peter Levi and Peter Jay, and his Irish friend, Desmond O'Grady.

He died in Athens on 12 May 1992.

Translations
Nikos Gatsos devoted considerable time to translating plays from various languages in Greek, mainly for the Greek National Theatre, the Greek Theatre of Art, and the Greek Popular Theatre. In 1944, he translated (for Filologika Chronika) the poem "Night song" by Federico García Lorca. He also translated the following plays:

 Federico García Lorca
 Blood Wedding
 The House of Bernarda Alba
 August Strindberg
 The Father
 Eugene O'Neill
 Long Day's Journey Into Night

All of the plays he translated were staged at the Greek National Theatre and the Greek Theatre of Art. He also associated with the magazines Nea Estia, Tram, Makedonikes Imeres, Mikro Tetradio, Nea Grammata, Filologika Chronika, and Kallitechnika Nea. In addition, he directed plays during his association with Greek radio.

Lyrics
Nikos Gatsos played a great role, as a poet, in Greek song. He wrote lyrics for major Greek composers, including Manos Hadjidakis, Mikis Theodorakis, Stavros Xarchakos, Dimos Moutsis, Loukianos Kilaidonis, Christodoulos Chalaris and Eleni Karaindrou. He wrote lyrics for several films and for the Elia Kazan's "America-America". His lyrics are known over the world because of Nana Mouskouri.

His lyrics are collected in the book Ola ta tragoudia (Patakis, 1999).

Select bibliography

The following bibliography includes Gatsos' major publications in Greek and books consisting of or including a substantial number of English translations of Gatsos' writings.  The Greek text of Amorgos, Gatsos' most famous work, is not given an individual entry since it went through a number of editions in Greek, most of which are now out of print.

Nikos Gatsos. Theatro kai poiēsē: Phederiko Gkarthia Lorka. Hellēnikē apodosē.  Ikaros 1990.
Nikos Gatsos. Physa aeraki, physa me mē chamēlōneis isame. prometōpida Odyssea Elytē; partitoura Manou Chatzidaki.  Ikaros Ekdotikē Hetairia 1992.
Nikos Gatsos. Amorgos. translated by Sally Purcell. (1980; repr. 1986; repr. London, Anvil Press Poetry, 1998.
M. Byron Raizis. Greek Poetry Translations.  Athens, Efstathiadis, 1981.
Peter Bien, Peter Constantine, Edmund Keeley, Karen Van Dyck. A century of Greek poetry:1900-2000, Bilingual ed. River Vale, NJ, Cosmos Pub., 2004.
The Charioteer: An Annual Review of Modern Greek Culture number 36 1995-1996 (Special double issue Nikos Gatsos)
Kimon Friar. Modern Greek Poetry. Athens, Edstathiadis, 1993.

References

External links
Early Uncollected Poems (1931-33) before Amorgos
Site at the University of Patras (in Greek)
Complete poems in Greek and English translation
Biography of Gatsos at Denise Harvey & Co.
Nikos Gatsos fan page

1911 births
1992 deaths
People from Arcadia, Peloponnese
Greek lyricists
Greek translators
Modern Greek poets
20th-century translators
20th-century Greek poets